Pasupuleti Balaraju (born 12 June 1964) is an Indian politician and a legislator from Andhra Pradesh, India. He belongs to Jana Sena Party and he worked in Indian National Congress party. He is a former minister for Tribal welfare in the Government of Andhra Pradesh.

Early life 
Pasupuleti Balaraju was born in Gudem Kotha Veedhi mandal in Visakhapatnam district of Andhra Pradesh. He earned a master's degree in Arts from Annamalai University. Before entering into politics he worked as Conductor, Teacher & Coffee board president. He entered into politics at the age of 25 as mandal president.

Political career
Pasupuleti Balaraju was elected to the Andhra Pradesh legislative assembly from the Chintapalle constituency in 1989 and from Paderu constituency in 2009 in Visakhapatnam district of Andhra Pradesh on Indian National Congress party ticket. He became a minister in the cabinets of Y. S. Rajasekhara Reddy and N. Kiran Kumar Reddy holding Tribal Welfare portfolio. He served as the Minister for rural and interior development and Tribal Welfare in the government of Andhra Pradesh during 2009–2014.

References

Andhra Pradesh MLAs 1989–1994
Indian National Congress politicians from Andhra Pradesh
People from Visakhapatnam district
Living people
1964 births
Andhra Pradesh MLAs 2009–2014
Annamalai University alumni
Jana Sena Party politicians